North Middlesex University Hospital NHS Trust is an NHS trust which runs North Middlesex University Hospital in Edmonton, London and community services in Enfield. The trust serves more than 350,000 people living in the London boroughs of Enfield and Haringey, as well as the nearby boroughs of Barnet and Waltham Forest.  It works closely with the Royal Free London NHS Foundation Trust but the board voted against full membership of the Royal Free London group in October 2018.

The trust provides a full range of adult, elderly and children's services across medical and surgical disciplines. Its specialist services include stroke, HIV/AIDS, cardiology (including heart failure care), haematology, diabetes, sleep studies, fertility and orthopaedics. Its sickle cell and thalassaemia department is nationally recognised as a leading centre for these diseases.

In May 2018 the trust banned the 444 and 491 buses from the northern perimeter road because cars were following buses through an automatic barrier. The Enfield Transport User Group made a formal complaint about the lack of a  risk assessment  and the problems caused for patients who rely on public transport.

Staffing
Dr Nnenna Osuji took over as Chief Executive in July 2021 following the departure of Maria Kane OBE in April 2021. Elizabeth McManus, who was chief executive before Maria Kane, resigned in 2017.

The trust has had serious problems with its accident and emergency service failing to meet the Four Hour Emergency Target since 2016, and so had difficulty recruiting senior staff. The General Medical Council and Health Education England considered removing junior doctors from the A&E. It had the poorest A&E waiting times in London with only seven of the 15 consultant posts and seven of 13 middle-grade emergency posts filled.  In October 2018 it succeeded in recruiting a substantive chief operating officer from Barking, Havering and Redbridge University Hospitals NHS Trust and Emma Whicher, NHS Improvement’s London medical director to be its medical director.

Performance
The Care Quality Commission reported some improvements in the accident and emergency department  after an inspection in September 2016 after earlier rating it as inadequate, but still noted nurse staffing shortages, inadequate checks on agency staff and a poor culture, especially in the maternity unit.

In December 2017 it was reported that during two weeks of data collection it had not had one day with any of its 460 beds unoccupied.

It ending the year 2017/8 with a £29 million deficit.  It has considered appealing to Tottenham Hotspur, with which it has an established relationship, for financial help. It was suggested that a 20p surcharge on food, drink and match programmes for fans attending home matches could raise around £300,000 a year.

There were 81 serious incidents reported by the trust in 2016-17 and 88 in 2017-18.

Healthwatch Enfield reported in March 2018 that 75% of the patients who attended the A&E department had not attempted to make a GP appointment. The trust has a GP-led urgent care centre but many patients preferred the A&E department because of the availability of X-ray, CT and MRI scans and blood tests. Maria Kane said: “It’s clear that as a local health system we are not communicating well enough the range of alternatives and how to use them.”

In February 2020 the Care Quality Commission praised the continuing improvements in the Accident and Emergency department at North Middlesex University Hospital in an inspection report. England's Chief Inspector of Hospitals, Professor Ted Baker, said: "Care provided at the North Middlesex University Hospital emergency department has continued to improve and I am pleased to see it".

References

External links 
 Official website
 CQC inspection reports

NHS hospital trusts
Health in London